Cadi, CADI, or Cadí may refer to:

CADI:
 Canadian Advanced Digital Ionosonde
 Career and Academic Development Institute, high school in Philadelphia
 Chengdu Aircraft Design Institute, an aircraft design institute located in Chengdu, China
 Club Aeronautique Delisle Incorporated, Canadian aircraft manufacturer

Cadi/Cadí:
 Cadi, Cadillac automobile
 Cadi, Welsh equivalent of Katherine
 Cadi Scientific, Singapore-based manufacturer of healthcare active RFID tags and systems
 Toponyms:
 Romansh name of Disentis Abbey and its territories, see Cadi (Surselva)
 Cadi (Phrygia), town and bishopric of ancient Phrygia
 Dharug name of Sydney and surrounds
 (El) Cadí or Cady (river), in SW Europe

See also
 Serra del Cadí, Spanish mountain range 
 Cady (disambiguation)
 Kadi (disambiguation)
Kady
Kady (given name)
 Qadi or cadi, a magistrate or judge of a Shariʿa court